Doctor Who – Pyramids of Mars is an album of incidental music composed by Dudley Simpson for the BBC television series Doctor Who. It features the music for five serials from Tom Baker's early period as the Fourth Doctor. As the original music tapes are missing, new recordings were made by Heathcliff Blair from Simpson's original manuscripts.

Track listing

References

Doctor Who soundtracks
Silva Screen Records soundtracks
1993 soundtrack albums